Scott Waldrom (born 25 July 1980) is a New Zealand former rugby union player. When Waldroms playing career finished in 2012 due to injury he was playing for the Waikato Chiefs in Super Rugby and Taranaki in the ITM Cup. He played in the openside flanker position.

Biography

Raised in Wainuiomata, Waldrom attended school at St Patricks College Silverstream where he was Head of Sport, Deputy Head Boy and Captain of the 1st XV, which he was in for 3 years. While at college he was involved in the Wellington U16 secondary school B team and the Wellington secondary school A team. He also made the New Zealand secondary school track and field team for 300m hurdles in 1998. After leaving school he was involved in the first ever Wellington Rugby Academy and was selected for Wellington U19, Wellington U21 and Wellington B team.

The older brother of England international Thomas Waldrom, he played for the New Zealand sevens team and the New Zealand Maori. He became an All Black in late 2008, however he never played in a test match, although he did play in the historic rematch against Munster. He played 10 years as a professional starting off with the Wellington lions and represented the Crusaders and Hurricanes before Taranaki and the Chiefs.

Waldrom was forced into retirement due to a broken bone in his foot that required ongoing surgery as he continued playing, injury plagued Waldroms playing career and stopped him potentially playing a lot more at a higher level.

He has since moved into coaching and won the national championship 7s with Wellington before doing an int-rem year with the New Zealand 7s team on the world Series.

Waldrom is currently retired from coaching representative rugby but continues to be involved with his club Avalon as an assistant coach and playing in social vet tournaments throughout the world, he also has a podcast for New Zealand Rugby on their rugby toolbox website.

External links 
Chiefs Player Profile
All Blacks Profile
itsrugby.co.uk profile

New Zealand rugby union players
1980 births
Living people
Rugby union players from Lower Hutt
New Zealand international rugby union players
Māori All Blacks players
Chiefs (rugby union) players
Hurricanes (rugby union) players
Crusaders (rugby union) players
Taranaki rugby union players
Wellington rugby union players
Rugby union flankers
New Zealand international rugby sevens players